Ekaterina Vladimirovna Vetkova (born 1 August 1986) is a Russian female handballer who plays as a pivot for Corona Brașov.

International achievements
EHF Champions League:
Winner: 2008, 2016 
EHF Champions Trophy:
Winner: 2008  
World Championship:
Gold Medallist: 2009
European Championship:
Bronze Medalist: 2009

References

External links

1986 births
Living people
People from Syzran
Russian female handball players
Olympic handball players of Russia
Russian expatriates in France
Russian expatriate sportspeople in Romania
SCM Râmnicu Vâlcea (handball) players
Sportspeople from Samara Oblast